Martin Fletcher (born 1947) is an English author and former NBC News' Middle East correspondent and Tel Aviv Bureau chief. He left NBC News after 32 years to work on his fourth book (and second novel). He returned to NBC in 2010 as a freelance Special Correspondent. He also reports for PBS Weekend Newshour.

Biography
Fletcher was born in London in 1947 to a Jewish family, the son of Georg and Edith, Austrian Jewish refugees to London. He graduated from the University of Bradford in 1970. He worked as a French and German interpreter for the European Economic Community. He began his career as a television news programming writer for Visnews in the UK in 1970. He joined the BBC, writing on the main evening television news program, the 9 O'Clock News, until returning to Visnews after teaching himself to be a news cameraman. After four years in Belgium, Israel, and Rhodesia he joined NBC News.

He started with NBC News as a cameraman in 1977 in South Africa; after working in the Paris and Frankfurt bureaus he began his Tel Aviv assignment as a network correspondent in 1982. He added Bureau Chief to his duties in 1996.

He has received five Emmy awards for his work on the first Palestinian uprising, the second Palestinian uprising, Rwanda, Kosovo, and trauma medicine in Israel. He has received numerous other awards including the television Pulitzer, the duPont from Columbia University, five Overseas Press Club awards, several Edward R. Murrow awards, a Hugo gold medal for a documentary on Israel which he shared with other NBC staffers, and an award from Britain's Royal Television Society.

Fletcher is the author of Breaking News, which has received universal recognition as one of the best books ever on the work of a foreign correspondent. His second book, Walking Israel: A Personal Search for the Soul of a Nation, was published in October 2010 and won the American National Jewish Book Award. His first novel, The List, published in 2011, was selected as the "One Book One Jewish Community" book of the year.

Books 
Nonfiction

 Breaking News: A Stunning and Memorable Account of Reporting from Some of the Most Dangerous Places in the World, New York: St. Martin's Press, 2008
 Walking Israel: A Personal Search for the Soul of a Nation, New York: St. Martin's Press, 2010

Fiction

 The List, New York: St. Martin's Press, 2011
 Jacob's Oath, New York: St. Martin's Press, 2013
 The War Reporter, New York: St. Martin's Press, 2015
 Promised Land, New York: St. Martin's Press, 2018

References

External links
Profile at MSNBC

Website

1947 births
Living people
American reporters and correspondents
British reporters and correspondents
NBC News people
English Jews
Alumni of the University of Bradford
British war correspondents